Charles B. Reynolds (April 12, 1846 – November 11, 1915) was an American politician in the state of Washington. He served in the Washington House of Representatives from 1895 to 1897.

References

Republican Party members of the Washington House of Representatives
1846 births
1915 deaths
People from Waterloo, New York
19th-century American politicians